Avison is a name. Notable people with that name include:

 As a surname
Al Avison (192084), American comic book artist
Charles Avison (170970), English composer during the Baroque and Classical periods
 David Avison (19372004), American photographer and physicist
John Avison (191583), Canadian conductor and pianist
Margaret Avison (19182007), Canadian prizewinning poet
 As a personal name
André Avison Tsitohery (active 2009), Malagasy politician
Avison Scott (18481925), English first class cricketer

See also
Avison Ensemble, one of England's foremost exponents of classical music on period instruments